The year 1784 in architecture involved some significant architectural events and new buildings.

Events

 September 1 – John Sanders becomes the first architectural student of John Soane.
 In Saint Petersburg, Russia, at the Gardens of Orienbaum, a ride is built that features carriages that undulate over hills within grooved tracks, a predecessor of the roller coaster.
 Étienne-Louis Boullée proposes a cenotaph to Isaac Newton.

Buildings and structures

Buildings
 St Andrew's Church in New Town, Edinburgh, Scotland, designed by Andrew Frazer and Robert Kay, opened.
 In New London, Connecticut, the town hall is built (1784/85).
 Ishak Pasha Palace is built in Turkey.
 Ubosot at Wat Phra Kaew temple in Bangkok, Thailand, receives the Emerald Buddha (March 22).
 Work starts on La Moneda Palace in Santiago, originally intended to house the Spanish mint in Colonial Chile, designed by Joaquín Toesca.

Awards
 Grand Prix de Rome, architecture: Auguste Cheval de Saint-Hubert.

Births
 January 11 – Thomas Hamilton, Scottish architect (died 1858)
 January 21 – Georg Moller, German architect and town planner (died 1852)
 February 29 – Leo von Klenze, German Neoclassicist architect (died 1864)
 October 3 – Ithiel Town, American architect and civil engineer (died 1844)

Deaths
 March – Thomas Cooley, English architect who worked in Dublin (born 1740)
 April 7 – Samuel Rhoads, American architect and cultural figure (born 1711)
 September 14 – James Essex, English builder and architect (born 1722)

References

Architecture
Years in architecture
18th-century architecture